Nicakṣu(9th century BC) was the last Kuru King of Hastinapur and first King of Vatsa kingdom. He is descendent of Janamejaya and the ancestor of King Udayana of Vatsa.

Reign 
He succeeded his father King Adhisimakrishna. The Puranas state that after the washing away of Hastinapura by the Ganges, the Bhārata king Nicakṣu, the great-great-grandson of Janamejaya, abandoned the city and settled in Kauśāmbī starting Vatsa branch of Kuru clan. This is supported by the Svapnavāsavadattā and the Pratijñā-Yaugandharāyaṇa attributed to Bhāsa.

References 

9th-century BC Indian monarchs